The Yamaha QT50 Yamahopper was produced by the Yamaha Motor Company from 1979 through 1992.  QT50s were popular in the late 1970s and 1980s,  These small motorcycles are easy to ride, maintain, and are fuel efficient.  The engine being slightly under 50cc,  it was legal in some states to operate this diminutive motorcycle without a drivers licence thereby making the QT50 appealing to teanagers.   The QT50 motorcycle resembles contemporary Mopeds and shares some features with Scooters.

The QT50 and the Honda Express are similar in appearance. Unlike a scooter, the QT50 has no fairing, sports footpegs rather than footboards, and its two-stroke reed valve engine is slung beneath the monotube frame motorcycle-style.   The Yamahopper has an approximate top speed of 30 mph in stock form, and thus can be used for city driving.

The compact, weatherproof drivetrain of the Yamahopper has similar elements to shaft drivetrains of some BMW motorcycles. It's simple, maintenance-free shaft-drive contained in the single-sided swingarm eliminates chain maintenance, safety and wear concerns as well as weather wear factors and contributes to the durability and ease of use of these tiny motorbikes. The drive unit also incorporates a traditional centrifugal clutch but only a single speed gearing, unlike most mopeds which have two speeds. The simplified driveshaft setup makes wheel changes easy.

Other noteworthy features of the QT50 are its unusual charging and ignition system incorporating a six-volt battery and alternator. This system eases cold starting: when the key is placed in the "start" position, the ignition supplies a stronger than normal spark for initial starting, but does not allow the engine to rev so as to avoid burning the piston.  Once kicked to life with the reverse-mounted, left-side kickstart lever, the key is turned to "run" and the engine is able to rev freely.

Popular modifications include: Yamaha YT60 cylinder, piston and rings. Yamaha MJ50 Towny two-speed crankcase and right-side swingarm. Yamaha PW50 rear gears. Mikuni VM15 and VM18 carburetors. Jemco exhaust, etc.

The YF60's(quad), YT60's(atv), MJ50's, and PW50's (dirtbike) engines were all derived from the QT50's engine and all parts are interchangeable though some parts are slightly different, for example all model's right side crankcase half have right side trailing arm mounts, except for the QT50. Most of the parts for the QT50 are still available from Yamaha dealers.  New and used parts are often found on eBay as well.

References

QT50
Motor scooters
Two-stroke motorcycles
Shaft drive motorcycles